Maja Miloš (born 16 May 1983) is a Serbian film director and screenwriter. She is most notable for creating the 2012 movie Clip.

Selected filmography
 Si Tu Timazin (2004) 
 Clip (2012)

References

External links
 "Klip" premijerno u SC-u 12. aprila at b92.net 
 

1983 births
Living people
Serbian film directors
Serbian women film directors
Serbian screenwriters
Film people from Belgrade